Teeboy Kamara (born 18 May 1996) is a soccer player who plays as a forward for Bayswater City in the NPL WA. Born in Liberia, he has represented Australia at youth level.

Early life
Kamara was born in 1996 in Liberia. He left with his family, arriving in Australia as a refugee in the early 2000s.

Club career

Adelaide United
In 2011, Kamara signed with A-League club Adelaide United. He made his professional debut in the 2011-12 A-League season on 16 December 2011, in a round 11 clash against Gold Coast United making him the youngest player to make a senior appearance in the competition at 15 years and 212 days old. He also made an additional 2 appearances in the Asian Champions League for Adelaide.

On 21 December 2011 it was announced he had signed a three-year senior contract with Adelaide United with the contract beginning on his 16th birthday.

However, in spite of a promising start to his career, Kamara was sidelined with an undisclosed illness over a two-year period. He was eventually released from his contract by the club. He was subsequently signed by Inglewood United to play in the NPL WA.

Personal life
In 2002 at the age of 6 he moved to Australia with his mother and siblings to escape the civil war in his homeland. His stepfather was the goalkeeper coach of the Liberia national football team.

References

1996 births
Living people
Association football forwards
Australian soccer players
Australian Institute of Sport soccer players
Salisbury United FC players
Croydon Kings players
Adelaide United FC players
A-League Men players
Liberian footballers
Liberian emigrants to Australia